Adil Kaskabay (born 13 May 1998) is a Kazakhstani swimmer. He competed in the men's 100 metre freestyle event at the 2017 World Aquatics Championships. In 2018, he won the bronze medal in the men's 4 × 100 metre medley relay event at the 2018 Asian Games held in Jakarta, Indonesia.

References

External links

1998 births
Living people
Kazakhstani male freestyle swimmers
Swimmers at the 2018 Asian Games
Asian Games bronze medalists for Kazakhstan
Asian Games medalists in swimming
Medalists at the 2018 Asian Games
Competitors at the 2017 Summer Universiade
Place of birth missing (living people)
21st-century Kazakhstani people